

Ernst-Anton von Krosigk (5 March 1898 – 16 March 1945) was a German general in the Wehrmacht during World War II who commanded the 16th Army. He was  a recipient of the  Knight's Cross of the Iron Cross with Oak Leaves of Nazi Germany. Krosigk was killed in an air-attack by Soviet forces on 16 March 1945 in the Courland Pocket.

Awards and decorations
 Iron Cross (1914)  2nd Class (25 September 1916) &  1st Class (12 September 1918)
 Clasp to the Iron Cross (1939)  2nd Class (20 May 1940) & 1st Class (19 June 1940)
 German Cross in Gold on 9 August 1942 as Oberst im Generalstab (in the General Staff) of the I. Armeekorps
 Knight's Cross of the Iron Cross with Oak Leaves
 Knight's Cross on 12 February 1944 as Generalmajor and commander of 1. Infanterie Division
 827th Oak Leaves on 12 April 1945 (Posthumously) as General der Infanterie and commander of XVI.Armeekorps

References

Citations

Bibliography

 
 
 

1898 births
1945 deaths
Military personnel from Berlin
Generals of Infantry (Wehrmacht)
German Army personnel of World War I
Recipients of the clasp to the Iron Cross, 1st class
Recipients of the Gold German Cross
Recipients of the Knight's Cross of the Iron Cross with Oak Leaves
German Army personnel killed in World War II
People from the Province of Brandenburg
Reichswehr personnel
20th-century Freikorps personnel
Deaths by airstrike during World War II
German Army generals of World War II